Nazis at the Center of the Earth is a 2012 American direct-to-video science fiction war film produced by The Asylum that stars Dominique Swain and Jake Busey. It was released on April 24, 2012 on Blu-ray Disc and DVD. The United Kingdom release was called Bloodstorm.

Plot 
On May 10, 1945, in a secret airport near Wurtzberg, Germany, Nazi scientist Dr. Josef Mengele, along with fellow doctors and soldiers, prepare to depart to an unknown location with a mysterious package in their possession. They are soon ambushed by the Allied forces, but successfully escape.

In present day, a group of researchers in Antarctica, Dr. Paige Morgan among them, are abducted by a platoon of gas-masked soldiers wearing swastika armbands and dragged into a hidden environment in the center of the Earth. There, they discover that Dr. Josef Mengele and a group of surviving Nazi soldiers are plotting an invasion of the surface of the Earth to create a Fourth Reich.

Cast
 Dominique Swain as Dr. Paige Morgan
 Jake Busey as Adrian Reistad
 Joshua Michael Allen as Lucas Moss
 Christopher Karl Johnson as Dr. Josef Mengele
 Lilan Bowden as May Yun
 Trevor Kuhn as Brian Moak
 Adam Burch as Mark Maynard
 Marlene Okner as Sije Lagesen
 Maria Pallas as Angela Magliarossa
 Andre Tenerelli as Aaron Blechman
 Abderrahim Halaimia as Rahul Jumani
 James Maxwell Young as Adolf Hitler

Production
Lawson received the directorial assignment after reading the script and pitching himself as director in the fall of 2011. The film took less than four months to make. On Asylum, Lawson said "They are a low-budget film studio,[...] I knew pretty much going in that this was going to be a B movie. We had a 12-day shoot and a budget well south of $200,000."

The entire movie was storyboarded by the director shot for shot before production began in November 2011.

Locations for the film included Willow Studios in Los Angeles (underground in the Nazi bunker and Nifleheim Station), Blue Cloud Ranch in Santa Clarita (opening war night scenes and the cavern), and the Asylum Studios (hallways, labs, medical rooms, rappelling scenes and green screen virtual sets).

The film features one of the highest visual effects shot counts in an Asylum film, 379, and the effects were completed in just four weeks.

In his commentary, director Joseph J. Lawson cites as his visual influences Steven Spielberg, Peter Jackson, Sam Raimi, John Carpenter, John Landis, David Lean, J. J. Abrams and Robert Rodriguez.

Reception
Critical and audience reaction to the film has been mixed with everything from "absolute garbage" to "the Citizen Kane of Asylum films".

References

External links
 Nazis at the Center of the Earth at The Asylum
 

2010s English-language films
2010s American films
2012 direct-to-video films
2012 independent films
2012 science fiction action films
2012 films
2010s war films
American science fiction action films
American science fiction war films
War adventure films
The Asylum films
Films directed by Joseph Lawson
Films set in Antarctica
Films shot in Los Angeles
Cultural depictions of Josef Mengele
Cultural depictions of Adolf Hitler
Films about Nazi fugitives
Alternate Nazi Germany films